Delaneys Creek is a rural locality in the Moreton Bay Region, Queensland, Australia.

Geography 
Delaneys Creek State Forest occupies the south east corner of the locality.  Delaneys Creek and Monkeybong Creek both flow northwestwards into the Stanley River.

Brisbane–Woodford Road (Mount Mee Road) runs through from south to north.

History 
The locality takes its name from the creek of the same name, which was named after Joseph Delaney, who was either an early selector or fossicker.

Delaneys Creek Provisional School was founded in 1892. In 1909 it became Delaneys Creek State School.

The median age of the Delaneys Creek population was 37 years, the same as the national median.  81.8% of people living in Delaneys Creek were born in Australia. The other top responses for country of birth were England 4.2%, New Zealand 2.4%, South Africa 1.5%, Germany 1.3%, Spain 0.6%.  90.2% of people spoke only English at home; the next most common languages were 1.4% Afrikaans, 1% German, 0.6% Dutch, 0.6% Japanese, 0.6% Danish.

Education 
Delaneys Creek State School is a government primary (Prep-6) school for boys and girls at Mount Mee Road. In 2018, the school had an enrolment of 155 students with 14 teachers (8 full-time equivalent) and 11 non-teaching staff (6 full-time equivalent).

There is no secondary school in Delaneys Creek. The nearest secondary school is Woodfood State School (to Year 10) in neighbouring Woodford to the north. For secondary schooling to Year 12, the nearest schools are Tullawong State High School in Caboolture to the south-east and  Kilcoy State High School in Kilcoy to the north-west.

References 

Suburbs of Moreton Bay Region
Localities in Queensland